There have been various arrangements to handle the Central Intelligence Agency's relationship with the United States Congress.

The formal liaison began some time before the 1960s, with a single position named the 'legislative liaison'. This later became the 'legislative counsel'. In the 1960s, an actual office was created for this purpose - the Office of Legislative Counsel.

In the 1970s, the Central Intelligence Agency (CIA) ramped up its congressional-liaison staff to deal with the large number of investigations coming from the Congress. It was the era of the Rockefeller Commission, the Church Committee, and the Pike Committee, all of which requested large amounts of information from the agency.
 
In the 1980s, there were several reorganizations and renaming of the office. Near the end of the 1980s, the office was renamed the Office of Congressional Affairs and has kept that name, as of 2009.

In the early 2000s (decade), the relationship became more intense, with debates about the Global war on terror and controversies surrounding it. For example, the CIA planned a secret program in 2001 but did not inform congress until much later.

Timeline 

This time line is based on information found in Snider, The Agency and the Hill, Chapter 4 (available online, see below under 'sources'). It lists the liaison, or the head of the liaison office, along with brief mentions of some significant events, reorganizations, and name changes.

 1946 – one liaison person, part of the Office of General Counsel (OGC)
 1946–1955 Walter Pforzheimer
 1956–1957 Norman Paul
 1957–1966 John Warner
 1966 – new office created – Office of Legislative Counsel (OLC)
 1966–1968 John Warner
 1968–1974 John Maury
 1974–1977 George Cary
 1970s – 'ad hoc Review Staff' operated alongside OLC, to respond to large number of congressional inquiries due to the Rockefeller Commission, the Church Committee, and the Pike Committee
 1978 – OLC grows to 28 people
 1978–1981 Fred Hitz
 1981 – OLC and Office of Public Affairs combined into the Office of External Affairs, with a 'Legislative Liaison Division'
 1981–1982 J William "Billy" Doswell
 1982 – Office of External Affairs ended. Office of Legislative Liaison created.
 1982–1984 Clair E. George
 1984–1986 Charles Briggs
 1986–1988 David D. Gries
 1980s – the Iran–Contra affair pits the Democratic party House of Representatives against the Reagan Doctrine as practiced in Central America by the CIA. It would lead to a number of prosecutions and the cutting of congressional funding to CIA's Contra program.
 198? – Office of Legislative Liaison is renamed to Office of Congressional Affairs (OCA)
 1988–1989 John Helgerson
 1989–1991 E. Norbert Garrett
 1991–1994 Stan Moskowitz
 1994–1996 Joanne Isham
 1996–2001 John H. Moseman
 2001–2004 Stan Moskowitz

1980s and Charlie Wilson 
During much of the 1980s a unique and unusual relationship evolved between Congress and the CIA in the person of Texas congressman Charlie Wilson from Texas's 2nd congressional district. Using his position on various House appropriations committees, and in partnership with CIA agent Gust Avrakotos, Wilson was able to increase CIA's funding the Afghan Mujahideen to several hundred million dollars a year during the Soviet–Afghan War. Author George Crile would describe Wilson as eventually becoming the "Agency's station chief on the Hill". He eventually got a position on the Intelligence Committee and was supposed to be overseeing the CIA.

See also 

Central Intelligence Agency Office of Inspector General

References 

CIA.gov
https://web.archive.org/web/20100220043044/http://www.kansaspress.ku.edu/barcia.html

Central Intelligence Agency
History of the United States Congress